

People

 Jules Marmier (1874–1975) is a composer, cellist, organist and Swiss choir leader from Collège Saint-Michel
 Xavier Marmier (1808–1892) was a French writer, traveler and translator of European literature of the North

Toponymy

Canada
 Marmier (township), territory in Mauricie, Quebec
 Marmier Street, road in Montreal, Quebec
 Marmier Street, road in Longueuil, Quebec